Gadoteridol (INN) is a gadolinium-based MRI contrast agent, used particularly in the imaging of the central nervous system. It is sold under the brand name ProHance.

References

Organogadolinium compounds
MRI contrast agents